Taihoku Prefecture (台北州; Taihoku-shū) was an administrative division of Taiwan created in 1920, during Japanese rule. The prefecture consisted of modern-day Keelung, New Taipei City, Taipei and Yilan County. Its government office, which is now occupied by the Control Yuan of Taiwan, was in Taihoku City (modern-day Taipei).

Population 
Population statistics of permanent residents in Taihoku Prefecture in 1941:

Administrative divisions

Cities and districts
There were 3 cities and 9 districts under Taihoku Prefecture.

All of the cities (市 shi) name in Chinese characters is carried from Japanese to Chinese.

Towns and villages

Buildings and establishments

Hospitals
Taihoku Imperial University Hospital (台北帝国大学医学部附属病院)
Japanese Red Cross Society Taiwan Branch Hospital (赤十字社台湾支部病院)
Government-General of Taiwan Monopoly Bureau Mutual Aid Association Hospital (台湾総督府専売局共済組合病院)
Government-General of Taiwan Railway Bureau Taihoku Railway Hospital (台湾総督府鉄道局台北鉄道病院)
Government-General of Taiwan Giran Hospital (台湾総督府宜蘭病院)
Government-General of Taiwan Kīrun Hospital (台湾総督府基隆病院)

Courthouses
Courthouses in 1945 (Shōwa 20)
Supreme Court of Appeal (高等法院上告部)
Supreme Judicial Court (高等法院覆審部)
Taihoku Regional Court (台北地方法院)
Taihoku Regional Court Giran Branch (台北地方法院宜蘭支部)

Penitentiaries
Penitentiaries in 1932 (Shōwa 7)
Taihoku Penitentiary (台北刑務所)
Taihoku Penitentiary Giran Branch (台北刑務所宜蘭刑務支所)

Police stations
Police stations in 1945 (Shōwa 20)
Taihoku Prefecture Police Administrative Division (台北州警務部)
Taihoku Police Station (台北南警察署)
Banka Police Substation 萬華分署)
Taihoku North Police Station (台北北警察署)
Kīrun Police Station (基隆警察署)
Kīrun Suijo Police Station (基隆水上警察署) (in Port of Kīrun)
Giran Police Station (宜蘭警察署)
Shichisei District Police Office (七星郡警察課)
Tamsui District Police Office (淡水郡警察課)
Kīrun District Police Office (基隆郡警察課)
Giran District Police Office (宜蘭郡警察課)
Ratō District Police Office (羅東郡警察課)
Suō District Police Office (蘇澳郡警察課)
Bunsan District Police Office (文山郡警察課)
Kaizan District Police Office (海山郡警察課)
Shinshō District Police Office (新荘郡警察課)

Customs houses

Monopoly bureaux

Weather stations

Garrisons

Mines
Kinkaseki mine (金瓜山鉱山) (Gold, Silver, Copper)
Zuihō mine (瑞芳鉱山) (Gold, Silver)
Kīrun coal mine (基隆炭鉱)
Zuihō coal mine (瑞芳炭鉱)
Haccho coal mine (八堵炭鉱)
Ishisoko coal mine (石底炭鉱)
Banri coal mine (万里炭鉱)
Tokukō Taihoku coal mine (徳興台北炭鉱)
Kuangsui sulfur mine (大礦砕鉱山)
Fukuyama coal mine (福山炭鉱)
Itabashi coal mine (板橋炭鉱)
Kaizan coal mine (海山炭鉱)

Shintō shrines

Taiwan Grand Shrine
Giran Shrine
Kīrun Shrine
Taiwan Martyr Shrine
Taihoku Inari Shrine
Kenkō Shrine
Zuihō Shrine
Shinshō Shrine
Ratō Shrine
Shiodome Shrine
Umiyama Shrine
Tamsui Shrine
Bunsan Shrine
Suō Shrine

National Parks

Daiton National Park (Established on 12 December 1937)
Tsugitaka Taroko National Park (Established on 12 December 1937)

Forest management

Transport

Rail

Roads
Designated roads in 1939 (Shōwa 14)
縦貫道路
Taihoku Tamsui Road (台北淡水道)
Taihoku Naiko Road (台北内湖道)
台北和尚州道
Taihoku Itabashi Road (台北板橋道)
児玉町枋寮道
台北八里庄道
台北三張犂道
Taihoku Shinkō Road (台北深坑道)
Taihoku Giran Road (台北宜蘭道)
水道町松山道
景尾亀山道
板橋景尾道
枋寮土城道
Itabashi Tōen Road (板橋桃園道)
Itabashi Ōka Road (板橋鶯歌道)
Shinshō Itabashi Road (新荘板橋道)
新荘樹林道
新荘和尚州道
新荘淡水道
Tamsui Kanayama Road (淡水金山道)
北投草山道
Shirin Kanayama Road (士林金山道)
基隆金山道
基隆社寮島道
基隆礁渓道
Giran Suō Road (宜蘭蘇澳道)
羅東利沢簡道
蘇澳南方澳道
蘇澳北方澳道
Ratō Sansei Road (羅東三星道)
Giran Tōen Road (宜蘭桃園道)
羅東清水道
宜蘭東港道
宜蘭三鬮道
Giran Sansei Road (宜蘭三星道)
Suō Karenkō Road (蘇澳花蓮港道)
Hokutō Onsen Road (北投温泉道)

Ports
Open ports in 1938 (Shōwa 13)
Port of Kīrun (基隆港)
Port of Tamsui (淡水港)

Enterprise

Media

Notable people 
List of notable people born in, or who grew up or were active in Taihoku Prefecture during Japanese rule.
Lee Teng-hui, former president of the Republic of China (born 15 January 1923 in Sanshi village).
Birei Kin, National Policy Advisor to President Chen Shui-bian, Taiwan independence activist, social commentator (born 7 February 1934).
Chiang Wei-shui, politician (8 February 1891 – 5 August 1931)
, writer.
Li Mei-shu, artist.

See also 
 Political divisions of Taiwan (1895-1945)
 Governor-General of Taiwan
 Taiwan under Japanese rule

1920 establishments in Taiwan
Former prefectures of Japan in Taiwan
History of Taipei
History of New Taipei
Keelung
Yilan County, Taiwan
States and territories disestablished in 1945